Apozol is a city in the state of Zacatecas.

References

Populated places in Zacatecas